Conasprella roberti is a species of sea snail, a marine gastropod mollusk in the family Conidae, the cone snails and their allies.

Like all species within the genus Conasprella, these cone snails are predatory and venomous. They are capable of "stinging" humans, therefore live ones should be handled carefully or not at all.

Description
The size of the shell attains 50 mm.

Distribution
This marine species occurs off Guadeloupe.

References

 Puillandre N., Duda T.F., Meyer C., Olivera B.M. & Bouchet P. (2015). One, four or 100 genera? A new classification of the cone snails. Journal of Molluscan Studies. 81: 1-23
 Richard, G., 2009. Conus roberti spec. nov., (Mollusca, Gastropoda, Conidae) de Guadeloupe, Antilles françaises et le groupe "Fusiconus" dans la province caraïbéenne. Annales de la Société des Sciences naturelles de Charente-Maritime 9(9): 921-928

External links
 The Conus Biodiversity website
 
 Holotype in MNHN, Paris

roberti
Gastropods described in 2009